David or Dave White may refer to:

Entertainment
 David White, better known as David Jason (born 1940), English actor and comedian
 David White (actor) (1916–1990), American television actor, Bewitched
 David White (musician) (1939–2019), doo-wop singer, Danny and the Juniors
 David A. R. White (born 1970), American television actor, Evening Shade
 David C. White, American television writer and producer
 Dave White (writer, born 1979), American novelist
 Dave White (artist) (born 1971), British artist
 David White (artist), British collage painter
 David White, American singer for heavy metal band Heathen
 David White (make-up artist), British film make-up artist
 David White (sound editor), Australian film sound editor
 David Patillo White (1828–1903), singing teacher and composer
 David R. White, American director of Dance Theater Workshop

Politics
 David White (U.S. politician) (1785–1834), representative from Kentucky
 David Frank White (1850–1897), served in the Virginia House of Delegates
 David White (MP), Member of Parliament (MP) for Salisbury, 1378–1388
 David White (Australian politician) (born 1944), Member of the Victorian Legislative Council from 1976–1996 and a member of the Kirner Ministry
 Dave White, candidate in the United States House of Representatives elections in Illinois, 2010

Sports
 David White (baseball) (born 1961), American-Australian baseball player
 David White (New Zealand cricketer) (born 1961), New Zealand batsman
 David White (English cricketer) (born 1967), English cricketer
 David White (English footballer) (born 1967), for Manchester City
 David White (Scottish footballer) (1933–2013), footballer and manager, Rangers F.C.
 David White (South African cricketer) (born 1991), South African cricketer
 David White (rugby league) (active 2000), English rugby league player

Other
 David Dunnels White (1844–1924), Medal of Honor recipient
 David Renfrew White (1847–1937), New Zealand university professor
 David White (geologist) (1862–1935), American 
 David E. White (born 1938), U.S. Navy admiral
 David Gordon White (born 1953), American religious historian
 David White (officer of arms) (born 1961), British heraldist and genealogist

See also
David Whyte (disambiguation)
David Wight (disambiguation)